Springfield College in Springfield, Massachusetts, is the oldest institution by this name; also has campuses in Houston, San Diego, Tampa, Boston, Manchester (New Hampshire), St. Johnsbury (Vermont),  Charleston (South Carolina), Milwaukee, Los Angeles, and Wilmington (Delaware)

Springfield College may also refer to any of the following:

Benedictine University at Springfield, defunct university formerly known as Springfield College in Illinois
Everest College (Missouri), formerly Springfield College
Springfield Anglican College, an independent day school in Springfield, Queensland, Australia. 
Springfield Technical Community College (STCC), also in Springfield, Massachusetts
Various institutions in the fictional town of Springfield on The Simpsons television show.